Will Youmans (born February 9, 1978) is an American writer and activist.

Youmans graduated from the University of Michigan with a bachelor's degree in political science in 2000. In 2003, he graduated from the University of California, Berkeley School of Law with a Juris Doctor degree. Youmans has a PhD in communication studies at his undergraduate alma mater, Michigan.

Activism and writing
He co-hosted and co-produced What's Happening? on the American channel of the international satellite TV station, Arab Radio and Television Network (ART). He has written in various media outlets, including the San Francisco Chronicle, The Michigan Daily, The Daily Californian, and CounterPunch.  He wrote a weekly column with The Arab American News.

Hip hop music
Youmans performed as hip hop artist 'Iron Sheik' from 2000 - 2006, and released Camel Clutch 2003 and Yet We Remain. Part of the Palestinian hip hop movement, much of his music related to the historical plight of Palestinians. Iron Sheik was featured in the BBC, CNN, The New York Times, and the French edition of Rolling Stone. He performed regularly throughout the United States, and appeared in Egypt, Lebanon, and the United Kingdom. He was profiled in an exhibit at the Arab American National Museum in Dearborn, Michigan.

Films
America at a Crossroads: Campus Battleground (2007), Public Broadcasting Service

References

External links

Official sites
 Personal website

Profiles and interviews
 The New York Times: "Drawing a Rap Refrain From a U.N. Resolution"
 San Francisco Chronicle profile
 Znet/Left Hook interview

1978 births
Living people
American activists
American columnists
American hip hop musicians
Midwest hip hop musicians
American journalists of Arab descent
American writers of Palestinian descent
Rappers from Detroit
University of Michigan College of Literature, Science, and the Arts alumni
UC Berkeley School of Law alumni
21st-century American rappers